Golden is a ghost town in Box Elder County, Utah, United States.

History
In 1899 and 1900, several gold ore-rich strikes were made in the Raft River Mountains, and the principal camp that grew around them was named Golden. The population of Golden grew to an estimated 500 residents.

Decline
An American financial crisis, the panic of 1907, damaged the mining industry severely. Legal tender currency was replaced with nearly worthless scrip, so the miners left. The general store moved its wares to Park Valley and Rosette, and the town was abandoned.

Resurgence
In 1910, several mines reopened, and the town had a short resurgence, then a boom in 1920, when a silver-rich ore was struck in Vipont. A tramway was built from the Vipont Mine to a concentrating mill, and 300 well-paid workers were hired. Ore was shipped from the area into the 1940s.

See also

List of ghost towns in Utah

References

Ghost towns in Box Elder County, Utah
Ghost towns in Utah